The Henry Miller House near Bellevue, Idaho is a historic house built from silver mining wealth that is listed on the National Register of Historic Places.

Lead and silver mining within quartz deposits in the area was initiated in 1879, and on September 22, 1880, claim was filed for what became the Minnie Moore lead and silver mine near Broadford, to the west of Bellevue.  Henry E. Miller purchased half ownership of the Minnie Moore mine for $10,000 in 1881;  even without accounting for the proceeds of mining for three years, he did well with the investment as the mine was sold to an English company in 1884 for $450,000.

The house was built in 1914, and is an example of Stick/Eastlake architecture.

It was listed on the National Register in 1975.

References 

Houses on the National Register of Historic Places in Idaho
Queen Anne architecture in Idaho
Houses completed in 1914
Houses in Blaine County, Idaho
National Register of Historic Places in Blaine County, Idaho
Bellevue, Idaho